Osanna are an Italian progressive rock band.

Origin
The group originated in the Vomero neighborhood of Naples with the union of  Lino Vairetti (voice), Danilo Rustici (guitar), Massimo Guarino (drums), Lello Brandi (bass), from the first line-up of the band Città Frontale, and Elio D'Anna (flute and sax), former member of the Showmen. Osanna were among the first bands in the world to present themselves theatrically in their shows, featuring costumes and made-up faces.

Artistic output
After the debut album L'uomo, they released the soundtrack for the film Milano Calibro 9. In 1972 they toured in Italy alongside Genesis. Their following album Palepoli (1973) is regarded as one of the finest hours of the Italian progressive rock movement, characterized by a wild composition fantasy which mixes Neapolitan and Mediterranean sounds with modern progressive rock elements, such as the extensive use of electric guitar and mellotron.

In 1974, despite strife amongst band members, they released Landscape of Life, which included participation from future rock and pop producer Corrado Rustici, brother of Danilo and former guitarist of Cervello, another artistic band hailing from Naples. The band disbanded but reformed in 1977 without D'Anna, who was replaced by keyboardist Fabrizio D'Angelo, while the bass role was taken up by Enzo Petrone. With this line-up they released Suddance in 1978, to a large extent containing lyrics in the Neapolitan language. 

Osanna disbanded again in 1979.

Reformation
The Osanna reformed in 1999, releasing the LP Taka boom the following year, including old successes and some new songs. Their next production was Prog Family, under the name of Osanna/Jackson, featuring figures of progressive rock history, such as Van der Graaf Generator's saxophonist David Jackson (as per name), King Crimson's David Cross, Balletto di Bronzo's Gianni Leone and others.

With David Jackson, the band released a single, "A zingara"/"L'uomo" in 2008. Later, with David Jackson and Gianni Leone, the band contributed eight tracks to the live boxed set Prog exhibition.

Rustici's death
Danilo Rustici died in Naples on 26 February 2021, at the age of 72 from the effects of COVID-19.

Discography
L'uomo (1971) 
Preludio Tema Variazioni e Canzona (best known as Milano Calibro 9, 1972) – issued in the US via Neil Kempfer-Stocker's imprint, COSMOS 
Palepoli (1973) 
Landscape of life (1974) – issued in the US via COSMOS 
Suddance, (1978) 
Taka boom, Afrakà (2001, anthology with new songs) 
Live - Uomini e Miti (live, 2003) 
Prog Family (2008, as Osanna Jackson)

See also
Italian progressive rock
Il Balletto di Bronzo
Il Banco del Mutuo Soccorso
I Cervello
La Locanda delle Fate
Le Orme
Nova (Italian band)
La Premiata Forneria Marconi
Il Rovescio della Medaglia

References

External links
 Italian prog website
 
 

Italian progressive rock groups
Italian rock music groups
Musical groups from Campania